Opercularia echinocephala (bristly headed stinkweed) is a species of plant within the genus Opercularia, in the family Rubiaceae.  It is endemic to the southwest of Western Australia.

Description
O. echinocephala is a spreading perennial from 0.1 to 1.3 m high which grows on flat plains and river banks on sands and lateritic soils. Its green/ pink flowers are seen from August to November.

It is found in the IBRA regions of Esperance Plains, Jarrah Forest, Swan Coastal Plain and Warren.

Taxonomy
It was first described by Bentham in 1867 as Opercularia echinocephala. No synonyms are listed by APNI, nor by Plants of the World online.

References

echinocephala
Flora of Western Australia
Taxa named by George Bentham
Plants described in 1867